Sun Du (1898–1967) was a Kuomintang general from Yunnan. From March 1945 until September 1947, he was the commander of the 1st Army Group of the National Revolutionary Army of the Republic of China.

See also
List of Army Groups of the National Revolutionary Army

1898 births
1967 deaths
National Revolutionary Army generals from Yunnan
People from Qujing
People's Republic of China politicians from Yunnan